Kevin Marshall (born March 10, 1989) is a Canadian former professional ice hockey defenceman who played for the Philadelphia Flyers in the National Hockey League (NHL).

Playing career
Marshall was drafted in the second round, 41st overall, of the 2007 NHL Entry Draft by the Philadelphia Flyers. He began his professional career in 2009 with Philadelphia's AHL affiliate, the Adirondack Phantoms, and spent most of the next three seasons with the Phantoms. He made his NHL debut on November 21, 2011 against the Carolina Hurricanes and played a total of ten games with the Flyers before being sent back down to the Phantoms. On February 2, 2012, Marshall was traded to the Washington Capitals for Matt Ford.

During the following 2012–13 season on March 14, 2013, Marshall was traded by the Capitals to the Toronto Maple Leafs in exchange for Nicolas Deschamps.

In the 2017–18 season, Marshall in the midst of his third Swedish Hockey League campaign with Rögle BK and after playing 13 games on loan with HockeyAllsvenskan club, IK Oskarshamn, opted to leave the club in transferring to German DEL club, Düsseldorfer EG, on November 10, 2017.

Following his second season with DEG in 2018–19 and after a first round defeat to Augsburger Panther, Marshall announced his retirement from his 10-year professional career.

Career statistics

Regular season and playoffs

International

Awards and honours

References

External links

 

1989 births
Living people
Adirondack Phantoms players
Anglophone Quebec people
Canadian ice hockey defencemen
Düsseldorfer EG players
Hershey Bears players
Ice hockey people from Quebec
IK Oskarshamn players
Lewiston Maineiacs players
People from Boucherville
Philadelphia Flyers draft picks
Philadelphia Flyers players
Quebec Remparts players
Rögle BK players
Toronto Marlies players
Canadian expatriate ice hockey players in Germany
Canadian expatriate ice hockey players in Sweden